Robert Henry Sorgenfrey (August 14, 1915 – January 7, 1996) was an American mathematician and Professor Emeritus of Mathematics at the University of California, Los Angeles. The Sorgenfrey line and the Sorgenfrey plane are named after him; the Sorgenfrey line was the first example of a normal topological space whose product with itself is not normal.

References 

1915 births
1996 deaths
20th-century American mathematicians